JamiiForums is a Tanzania-based social networking website in East Africa founded in 2006. The online network is notable as the most popular social media website in Tanzania, according to AllAfrica. The website emphasizes its use of user-generated content to avoid penalties faced by traditional media for reporting issues in Tanzania. According to Washington Post, recent Tanzanian bills have caused significant worry over potential media crackdown in Tanzania, though its founders faced several law charges over the years.

JamiiForums was officially launched in March 2006 with the name JamboForums, and comprised several online subforums. In May 2008 they changed their name to JamiiForums due to copyright issues. In March 2016, Jamii Media filed a lawsuit against the federal Tanzanian police force, alleging that the police force's power to demand personal information of individuals suspected of crimes was unconstitutional. The case will be processed through the High Court of Tanzania.

Controversy 
According to The Daily Beast and The Guardian, the website became a whistle blowing platform focused on current events and news, placing the website in direct opposition with the leading Tanzanian political party Chama Cha Mapinduzi. Tom Rhodes, a member of the Committee to Protect Journalists in East Africa, described the website as notable for its function as a "cathartic tool where even disgruntled politicians go and upload sensitive documents" in the Irish Times.

Due to its use as a whistle blowing platform, BBC News characterized the website as an East African version of Wikileaks and noted concern over rumors that the website was being hacked by the Tanzanian government. BBC further indicated that Google's search engine had lowered the ranking of the site due to concern over government influence.

Beyond user-generated content, the website advocates for freedom of media and digital rights in Tanzania. The director of the website spoke out against Tanzanian laws passed around 2016 that purportedly gave too much power to the Tanzanian National Bureau of Statistics.

On December 16, 2016, its Director, Maxence Melo was arrested by Tanzania Police for allegedly refusing to disclose the identities of anonymous bloggers and contributors who, the Tanzanian authorities claim, posted sensitive information on his popular blogging site

The 3 cases opened against Melo were concluded with one victory on April 8, 2020 when he was found not guilty but on the other two cases he was convicted and had to pay TZS 5million for his freedom on November 17, 2020 

From June 11, 2018, JamiiForums service was shut down and the platform was temporarily unavailable online due to failure of its owners to comply with government requirements of exposing users information and delaying paying registration fees as due to announcement made by Tanzania Regulatory Authority (TCRA). However, it resumed operation 21 days later.

References

Tanzanian social networking websites
Swahili-language websites